Niendorf Nord is the western terminus station for the rapid transit trains of Hamburg U-Bahn line U2. The station is located in the Niendorf quarter of Hamburg, Germany.

Services 
Niendorf Nord is served by Hamburg U-Bahn line U2; departures are every 10 minutes.

See also 

 List of Hamburg U-Bahn stations
 Hamburger Verkehrsverbund (Public transport association in Hamburg)
 Hamburger Hochbahn (Operator of the Hamburg U-Bahn)

References

External links

 Line and route network plans by hvv.de 

Hamburg U-Bahn stations in Hamburg
U2 (Hamburg U-Bahn) stations
Buildings and structures in Eimsbüttel
Railway stations in Germany opened in 1991